Cyperus trailii is a species of sedge that is native to northern parts of South America.

The species was first formally described by the botanist Charles Baron Clarke in 1908.

See also
 List of Cyperus species

References

trailii
Taxa named by Charles Baron Clarke
Plants described in 1908
Flora of Brazil
Flora of Venezuela
Flora of Suriname
Flora of Guyana